This is a list of the bird species recorded in the Virgin Islands. Species on this list are combined from the US Virgin Islands and the British Virgin Islands (which also maintain separate lists). It does not include what some call the Spanish Virgin Islands-Vieques, Culebra and minor surrounding islands which can be found on other lists. The avifauna of the Virgin Islands include a total of 276 species, of which 11 have been introduced by humans. 7 species are globally threatened.

This list's taxonomic treatment (designation and sequence of orders, families and species) and nomenclature (common and scientific names) follow the conventions of The Clements Checklist of Birds of the World, 2019 edition. The family accounts at the beginning of each heading reflect this taxonomy, as do the species counts found in each family account. Introduced and accidental species are included in the total counts for the Virgin Islands.

The following tags have been used to highlight several categories, but not all species fall into one of these categories. Those that do not are commonly occurring native species.

(A) Accidental - a species that rarely or accidentally occurs in the Virgin Islands
(I) Introduced - a species introduced to the Virgin Islands as a consequence, direct or indirect, of human actions
(Ex) Extirpated - a species that no longer occurs in the Virgin Islands although populations exist elsewhere

Ducks, geese, and waterfowl
Order: AnseriformesFamily: Anatidae

Anatidae includes the ducks and most duck-like waterfowl, such as geese and swans. These birds are adapted to an aquatic existence with webbed feet, flattened bills, and feathers that are excellent at shedding water due to an oily coating.

White-faced whistling-duck, Dendrocygna viduata (A)
Black-bellied whistling-duck, Dendrocygna autumnalis (A)
West Indian whistling-duck, Dendrocygna arborea (A)
Fulvous whistling-duck, Dendrocygna bicolor (A)
Snow goose, Chen caerulescens (A)
Tundra swan, Cygnus columbianus
Blue-winged teal, Spatula discors
Cinnamon teal, Spatula cyanoptera (A)
Northern shoveler, Spatula clypeata (A)
Gadwall, Mareca strepera (A)
American wigeon, Mareca americana (A)
Mallard, Anas platyrhynchos(A)
Northern pintail, Anas acuta (A)
White-cheeked pintail, Anas bahamensis
Northern pintail, Anas bahamensis (A)
Green-winged teal, Anas crecca (A)
Ring-necked duck, Aythya collaris (A)
Greater scaup, Aythya marila (A)
Lesser scaup, Aythya affinis (A)
Bufflehead, Bucephala albeola (A)
Hooded merganser, Lophodytes cucullatus (A)
Masked duck, Nomonyx dominica (A)
Ruddy duck, Oxyura jamaicensis

Guineafowl
Order: GalliformesFamily: Numididae

Guineafowl are a group of African, seed-eating, ground-nesting birds that resemble partridges, but with featherless heads and spangled grey plumage.

Helmeted guineafowl, Numida meleagris (I)

New World quails
Order: GalliformesFamily: Odontophoridae

The New World quails are small, plump terrestrial birds only distantly related to the quails of the Old World, but named for their similar appearance and habits.

Northern bobwhite, Colinus virginianus (I) (extirpated)
Crested bobwhite, Colinus cristatus (I) (extirpated)
California quail, Callipepla californica (I) (extirpated)

Pheasants, grouse, and allies
Order: GalliformesFamily: Phasianidae

The Phasianidae are a family of terrestrial birds which consists of quails, partridges, snowcocks, francolins, spurfowls, tragopans, monals, pheasants, peafowls, and jungle fowls. In general, they are plump (although they vary in size) and have broad, relatively short wings.

Red junglefowl, Gallus gallus (I)

Flamingos
Order: PhoenicopteriformesFamily: Phoenicopteridae

Flamingos filter-feed on shellfish and algae. Their oddly shaped beaks are specially adapted to separate mud and silt from the food they consume and, uniquely, are used upside-down.

American flamingo, Phoenicopterus ruber (A)

Grebes
Order: PodicipediformesFamily: Podicipedidae

Grebes are small to medium-large freshwater diving birds. They have lobed toes and are excellent swimmers and divers. However, they have their feet placed far back on the body, making them quite ungainly on land.

Least grebe, Tachybaptus dominicus (A)
Pied-billed grebe, Podilymbus podiceps (A)

Pigeons and doves
Order: ColumbiformesFamily: Columbidae

Pigeons and doves are stout-bodied birds with short necks and short slender bills with a fleshy cere.

Rock pigeon, Columba livia (I)
Scaly-naped pigeon, Patagioenas squamosa
White-crowned pigeon, Patagioenas leucocephala
Eurasian collared-dove, Streptopelia decaocto (I)
Common ground dove, Columbina passerina
Ruddy quail-dove, Geotrygon montana (A)
Bridled quail-dove, Geotrygon mystacea (A)
White-winged dove, Zenaida asiatica (A)
Zenaida dove, Zenaida aurita
Mourning dove, Zenaida macroura (A)

Cuckoos
Order: CuculiformesFamily: Cuculidae

The family Cuculidae includes cuckoos, roadrunners and anis. These birds are of variable size with slender bodies, long tails and strong legs.

Greater ani, Crotophaga major (A)
Smooth-billed ani, Crotophaga ani
Yellow-billed cuckoo, Coccyzus americanus (A)
Mangrove cuckoo, Coccyzus minor
Puerto Rican lizard cuckoo, Saurothera vieilloti (A)

Nightjars and allies
Order: CaprimulgiformesFamily: Caprimulgidae

Nightjars are medium-sized nocturnal birds that usually nest on the ground. They have long wings, short legs and very short bills. Most have small feet, of little use for walking, and long pointed wings. Their soft plumage is camouflaged to resemble bark or leaves.

Common nighthawk, Chordeiles minor (A)
Antillean nighthawk, Chordeiles gundlachii
Chuck-will's-widow, Antrostomus carolinensis (A)

Swifts
Order: CaprimulgiformesFamily: Apodidae

Swifts are small birds which spend the majority of their lives flying. These birds have very short legs and never settle voluntarily on the ground, perching instead only on vertical surfaces. Many swifts have long swept-back wings which resemble a crescent or boomerang.

Black swift, Cypseloides niger (A)
Chimney swift, Chaetura pelagica (A)
Short-tailed swift, Chaetura brachyura (A)

Hummingbirds
Order: CaprimulgiformesFamily: Trochilidae

Hummingbirds are small birds capable of hovering in mid-air due to the rapid flapping of their wings. They are the only birds that can fly backwards.

Puerto Rican mango, Anthracothorax aurulentus (A)
Green mango, Anthracothorax viridis (A)
Purple-throated carib, Eulampis jugularis (A)
Green-throated carib, Eulampis holosericeus
Antillean crested hummingbird, Orthorhyncus cristatus

Rails, gallinules and coots
Order: GruiformesFamily: Rallidae

Rallidae is a large family of small to medium-sized birds which includes the rails, crakes, coots and gallinules. Typically they inhabit dense vegetation in damp environments near lakes, swamps or rivers. In general they are shy and secretive birds, making them difficult to observe. Most species have strong legs and long toes which are well adapted to soft uneven surfaces. They tend to have short, rounded wings and to be weak fliers.

Clapper rail, Rallus crepitans
Sora, Porzana carolina (A)
Common gallinule, Gallinula galeata
American coot, Fulica americana 
Purple gallinule, Porphyrio martinicus (A)

Stilts and avocets
Order: CharadriiformesFamily: Recurvirostridae

Recurvirostridae is a family of large wading birds, which includes the avocets and stilts. The avocets have long legs and long up-curved bills. The stilts have extremely long legs and long, thin, straight bills.

Black-necked stilt, Himantopus mexicanus
American avocet, Recurvirostra americana (A)

Oystercatchers
Order: CharadriiformesFamily: Haematopodidae

The oystercatchers are large and noisy plover-like birds, with strong bills used for smashing or prising open molluscs.

American oystercatcher, Haematopus palliatus

Plovers and lapwings
Order: CharadriiformesFamily: Charadriidae

The family Charadriidae includes the plovers, dotterels and lapwings. They are small to medium-sized birds with compact bodies, short, thick necks and long, usually pointed, wings. They are found in open country worldwide, mostly in habitats near water.

Black-bellied plover, Pluvialis squatarola
American golden-plover, Pluvialis dominica (A)
Snowy plover, Charadrius nivosus (A)
Wilson's plover, Charadrius wilsonia
Semipalmated plover, Charadrius semipalmatus
Piping plover, Charadrius melodus (A)
Killdeer, Charadrius vociferus

Sandpipers and allies
Order: CharadriiformesFamily: Scolopacidae

Scolopacidae is a large diverse family of small to medium-sized shorebirds including the sandpipers, curlews, godwits, shanks, tattlers, woodcocks, snipes, dowitchers and phalaropes. The majority of these species eat small invertebrates picked out of the mud or soil. Variation in length of legs and bills enables multiple species to feed in the same habitat, particularly on the coast, without direct competition for food.

Upland sandpiper, Bartramia longicauda (A)
Whimbrel, Numenius phaeopus
Long-billed curlew, Numenius americanus (A)
Bar-tailed godwit, Limosa lapponica (A)
Hudsonian godwit, Limosa haemastica (A)
Marbled godwit, Limosa fedoa (A)
Ruddy turnstone, Arenaria interpres
Red knot, Calidris canutus (A)
Ruff, Calidris pugnax (A)
Stilt sandpiper, Calidris himantopus
Curlew sandpiper, Calidris ferruginea (A)
Sanderling, Calidris alba (A)
Dunlin, Calidris alpina (A)
Baird's sandpiper, Calidris bairdii (A)
Least sandpiper, Calidris minutilla
White-rumped sandpiper, Calidris fuscicollis 
Buff-breasted sandpiper, Calidris subruficollis (A)
Pectoral sandpiper, Calidris melanotos
Semipalmated sandpiper, Calidris pusilla 
Western sandpiper, Calidris mauri (A)
Short-billed dowitcher, Limnodromus griseus 
Long-billed dowitcher, Limnodromus scolopaceus (A)
Wilson's snipe, Gallinago delicata 
Wilson's phalarope, Phalaropus tricolor (A)
Red-necked phalarope, Phalaropus lobatus (A)
Red phalarope, Phalaropus fulicarius (A)
Spotted sandpiper, Actitis macularia
Solitary sandpiper, Tringa solitaria 
Greater yellowlegs, Tringa melanoleuca
Willet, Tringa semipalmata 
Lesser yellowlegs, Tringa flavipes

Skuas and jaegers
Order: CharadriiformesFamily: Stercorariidae

The family Stercorariidae are, in general, medium to large birds, typically with grey or brown plumage, often with white markings on the wings. They nest on the ground in temperate and arctic regions and are long-distance migrants.

Great skua, Stercorarius skua (A)
Pomarine jaeger, Stercorarius pomarinus (A)
Parasitic jaeger, Stercorarius parasiticus (A)

Gulls, terns and skimmers
Order: CharadriiformesFamily: Laridae

Laridae is a family of medium to large seabirds and includes gulls, kittiwakes, terns and skimmers. They are typically grey or white, often with black markings on the head or wings. They have stout, longish bills and webbed feet. Terns are a group of generally medium to large seabirds typically with grey or white plumage, often with black markings on the head. Most terns hunt fish by diving but some pick insects off the surface of fresh water. Terns are generally long-lived birds, with several species known to live in excess of 30 years. Skimmers are a small family of tropical tern-like birds. They have an elongated lower mandible which they use to feed by flying low over the water surface and skimming the water for small fish.

Black-legged kittiwake, Rissa tridactyla (A)
Bonaparte's gull, Chroicocephalus philadelphia (A)
Black-headed gull, Chroicocephalus ridibundus (A)
Laughing gull, Leucophaeus atricilla
Ring-billed gull, Larus delawarensis (A)
Herring gull, Larus argentatus (A)
Lesser black-backed gull, Larus fuscus (A)
Great black-backed gull, Larus marinus (A)
Brown noddy, Anous stolidus
Sooty tern, Onychoprion fuscatus
Bridled tern, Onychoprion anaethetus
Least tern, Sternula antillarum 
Gull-billed tern, Gelochelidon nilotica (A)
Caspian tern, Hydroprogne caspia (A)
Black tern, Chlidonias niger (A)
White-winged tern, Chlidonias leucopterus (A)
Roseate tern, Sterna dougallii
Common tern, Sterna hirundo 
Arctic tern, Sterna paradisaea (A)
Forster's tern, Sterna forsteri (A)
Royal tern, Thalasseus maximus
Sandwich tern, Thalasseus sandvicensis 
Black skimmer, Rynchops niger (A)

Tropicbirds
Order: PhaethontiformesFamily: Phaethontidae

Tropicbirds are slender white birds of tropical oceans, with exceptionally long central tail feathers. Their heads and long wings have black markings.

White-tailed tropicbird, Phaethon lepturus
Red-billed tropicbird, Phaethon aethereus

Southern storm-petrels
Order: ProcellariiformesFamily: Oceanitidae

The southern storm-petrels are relatives of the petrels and are the smallest seabirds. They feed on planktonic crustaceans and small fish picked from the surface, typically while hovering. The flight is fluttering and sometimes bat-like.

Wilson's storm-petrel, Oceanites oceanicus (A)

Northern storm-petrels
Order: ProcellariiformesFamily: Hydrobatidae

Though the members of this family are similar in many respects to the southern storm-petrels, including their general appearance and habits, there are enough genetic differences to warrant their placement in a separate family.

Leach's storm-petrel, Oceanodroma leucorhoa (A)

Shearwaters and petrels
Order: ProcellariiformesFamily: Procellariidae

The procellariids are the main group of medium-sized "true petrels", characterised by united nostrils with medium septum and a long outer functional primary.

Black-capped petrel, Pterodroma hasitata
Great shearwater, Ardenna gravis (A)
Sooty shearwater, Ardenna griseus
Audubon's shearwater, Puffinus lherminieri

Frigatebirds
Order: SuliformesFamily: Fregatidae

Frigatebirds are large seabirds usually found over tropical oceans. They are large, black-and-white or completely black, with long wings and deeply forked tails. The males have coloured inflatable throat pouches. They do not swim or walk and cannot take off from a flat surface. Having the largest wingspan-to-body-weight ratio of any bird, they are essentially aerial, able to stay aloft for more than a week.

Magnificent frigatebird, Fregata magnificens

Boobies and gannets
Order: SuliformesFamily: Sulidae

The sulids comprise the gannets and boobies. Both groups are medium to large coastal seabirds that plunge-dive for fish.

Masked booby, Sula dactylatra (A)
Brown booby, Sula leucogaster
Red-footed booby, Sula sula (A)

Cormorants and shags
Order: SuliformesFamily: Phalacrocoracidae

Phalacrocoracidae is a family of medium to large coastal, fish-eating seabirds that includes cormorants and shags. Plumage colouration varies, with the majority having mainly dark plumage, some species being black-and-white and a few being colourful.

Neotropic cormorant, Phalacrocorax brasilianus (A)
Double-crested cormorant, Phalacrocorax auritus (A)

Pelicans
Order: PelecaniformesFamily: Pelecanidae

Pelicans are large water birds with a distinctive pouch under their beak. As with other members of the order Pelecaniformes, they have webbed feet with four toes.

American white pelican, Pelecanus erythrorhynchos (A) 
Brown pelican, Pelecanus occidentalis

Herons, egrets, and bitterns
Order: PelecaniformesFamily: Ardeidae

The family Ardeidae contains the bitterns, herons and egrets. Herons and egrets are medium to large wading birds with long necks and legs. Bitterns tend to be shorter necked and more wary. Members of Ardeidae fly with their necks retracted, unlike other long-necked birds such as storks, ibises and spoonbills.

American bittern, Botaurus lentiginosus (A)
Least bittern, Ixobrychus exilis (A)
Great blue heron, Ardea herodias
Great egret, Ardea alba
Little egret, Egretta garzetta (A)
Western reef-heron, Egretta gularis (A)
Snowy egret, Egretta thula
Little blue heron, Egretta caerulea
Tricolored heron, Egretta tricolor
Reddish egret, Egretta rufescens (A)
Cattle egret, Bubulcus ibis
Green heron, Butorides virescens
Black-crowned night-heron, Nycticorax nycticorax 
Yellow-crowned night-heron, Nyctanassa violacea

Ibises and spoonbills
Order: PelecaniformesFamily: Threskiornithidae

Threskiornithidae is a family of large terrestrial and wading birds which includes the ibises and spoonbills. They have long, broad wings with 11 primary and about 20 secondary feathers. They are strong fliers and despite their size and weight, very capable soarers.

White ibis, Eudocimus albus (A)
Scarlet ibis, Eudocimus ruber (I)
Glossy ibis, Plegadis falcinellus (A)
Roseate spoonbill, Platalea ajaja (A)

New World vultures
Order: CathartiformesFamily: Cathartidae

The New World vultures are not closely related to Old World vultures, but superficially resemble them because of convergent evolution. Like the Old World vultures, they are scavengers. However, unlike Old World vultures, which find carcasses by sight, New World vultures have a good sense of smell with which they locate carrion.

Turkey vulture, Cathartes aura (A)

Osprey
Order: AccipitriformesFamily: Pandionidae

The family Pandionidae contains only one species, the osprey. The osprey is a medium-large raptor which is a specialist fish-eater with a worldwide distribution.

Osprey, Pandion haliaetus

Hawks, eagles, and kites
Order: AccipitriformesFamily: Accipitridae

Accipitridae is a family of birds of prey, which includes hawks, eagles, kites, harriers and Old World vultures. These birds have powerful hooked beaks for tearing flesh from their prey, strong legs, powerful talons and keen eyesight.

Swallow-tailed kite, Elanoides forficatus (A)
Northern harrier, Circus cyaneus (A)
Sharp-shinned hawk, Accipiter striatus (A)
Black kite, Milvus migrans (A)
Bald eagle, Haliaeetus leucocephalus (A)
Broad-winged hawk, Buteo platypterus (A)
Red-tailed hawk, Buteo jamaicensis

Owls
Order: StrigiformesFamily: Strigidae

The typical owls are small to large solitary nocturnal birds of prey. They have large forward-facing eyes and ears, a hawk-like beak and a conspicuous circle of feathers around each eye called a facial disk.

Puerto Rican owl, Gymnasio nudipes (Ex)
Short-eared owl, Asio flammeus (A)

Kingfishers
Order: CoraciiformesFamily: Alcedinidae

Kingfishers are medium-sized birds with large heads, long, pointed bills, short legs and stubby tails.

Belted kingfisher, Megaceryle alcyon

Woodpeckers
Order: PiciformesFamily: Picidae

Woodpeckers are small to medium-sized birds with chisel-like beaks, short legs, stiff tails and long tongues used for capturing insects. Some species have feet with two toes pointing forward and two backward, while several species have only three toes. Many woodpeckers have the habit of tapping noisily on tree trunks with their beaks.

Yellow-bellied sapsucker, Sphyrapicus varius (A)
Puerto Rican woodpecker, Melanerpes portoricensis (Ex)

Falcons and caracaras
Order: FalconiformesFamily: Falconidae

Falconidae is a family of diurnal birds of prey. They differ from hawks, eagles and kites in that they kill with their beaks instead of their talons.

American kestrel, Falco sparverius
Merlin, Falco columbarius 
Peregrine falcon, Falco peregrinus

Old World parrots
Order: PsittaciformesFamily: Psittacidae

Parrots are small to large birds with a characteristic curved beak. Their upper mandibles have slight mobility in the joint with the skull and they have a generally erect stance. All parrots are zygodactyl, having the four toes on each foot placed two at the front and two to the back.

Monk parakeet, Myiopsitta monachus (A)
White-winged parakeet, Brotogeris versicolurus (A)
Hispaniolan parrot, Amazona ventralis (I)
Brown-throated parakeet, Eupsittula pertinax (I)

Tyrant flycatchers
Order: PasseriformesFamily: Tyrannidae

Tyrant flycatchers are passerine birds which occur throughout North and South America. They superficially resemble the Old World flycatchers, but are more robust and have stronger bills. They do not have the sophisticated vocal capabilities of the songbirds. Most, but not all, have plain colouring. As the name implies, most are insectivorous.

Caribbean elaenia, Elaenia martinica
Eastern wood-pewee, Contopus virens (A)
Stolid flycatcher, Myiarchus stolidus (A)
Puerto Rican flycatcher, Myiarchus antillarum 
Tropical kingbird, Tyrannus melancholicus (A)
Gray kingbird, Tyrannus dominicensis
Fork-tailed flycatcher, Tyrannus savana (A)

Vireos, shrike-babblers, and erpornis
Order: PasseriformesFamily: Vireonidae

The vireos are a group of small to medium-sized passerine birds. They are typically greenish in colour and resemble wood warblers apart from their heavier bills.

White-eyed vireo, Vireo griseus (A)
Yellow-throated vireo, Vireo flavifrons (A)
Red-eyed vireo, Vireo olivaceus (A)
Black-whiskered vireo, Vireo altiloquus

Swallows
Order: PasseriformesFamily: Hirundinidae

The family Hirundinidae is adapted to aerial feeding. They have a slender streamlined body, long pointed wings and a short bill with a wide gape. The feet are adapted to perching rather than walking, and the front toes are partially joined at the base.

Northern rough-winged swallow, Stelgidopteryx serripennis (A)
Purple martin, Progne subis (A)
Caribbean martin, Progne dominicensis
Tree swallow, Tachycineta bicolor (A)
Bank swallow, Riparia riparia (A)
Barn swallow, Hirundo rustica
Cliff swallow, Petrochelidon pyrrhonota (A)
Cave swallow, Petrochelidon fulva (A)

Starlings
Order: PasseriformesFamily: Sturnidae

Starlings are small to medium-sized passerine birds. Their flight is strong and direct and they are very gregarious. Their preferred habitat is fairly open country. They eat insects and fruit. Plumage is typically dark with a metallic sheen.

European starling, Sturnus vulgaris (I)(A)

Mockingbirds and thrashers
Order: PasseriformesFamily: Mimidae

The mimids are a family of passerine birds that includes thrashers, mockingbirds, tremblers and the New World catbirds. These birds are notable for their vocalizations, especially their ability to mimic a wide variety of birds and other sounds heard outdoors. Their colouring tends towards dull-greys and browns.

Gray catbird, Dumetella carolinensis (A)
Pearly-eyed thrasher, Margarops fuscatus
Brown trembler, Cinclocerthia ruficauda (A)
Northern mockingbird, Mimus polyglottos

Thrushes and allies
Order: PasseriformesFamily: Turdidae

The thrushes are a group of passerine birds that occur mainly in the Old World. They are plump, soft plumaged, small to medium-sized insectivores or sometimes omnivores, often feeding on the ground. Many have attractive songs.

Eastern bluebird, Sialia sialis (A)
Veery, Catharus fuscescens (A)
Gray-cheeked thrush, Catharus minimus (A)
Bicknell's thrush, Catharus bicknelli (A)
Swainson's thrush, Catharus ustulatus
Red-legged thrush, Turdus plumbeus (A)

Waxwings
Order: PasseriformesFamily: Bombycillidae

The waxwings are a group of birds with soft silky plumage and unique red tips to some of the wing feathers. In the Bohemian and cedar waxwings, these tips look like sealing wax and give the group its name. These are arboreal birds of northern forests. They live on insects in summer and berries in winter.

Cedar waxwing, Bombycilla cedrorum (A)

Weavers and allies
Order: PasseriformesFamily: Ploceidae

The weavers are small passerine birds related to the finches. They are seed-eating birds with rounded conical bills. The males of many species are brightly coloured, usually in red or yellow and black, some species show variation in colour only in the breeding season.

Northern red bishop, Euplectes franciscanus (I)(A)

Waxbills and allies
Order: PasseriformesFamily: Estrildidae

The estrildid finches are small passerine birds of the Old World tropics and Australasia. They are gregarious and often colonial seed eaters with short thick but pointed bills. They are all similar in structure and habits, but have wide variation in plumage colours and patterns.

Bronze mannikin, Spermestes cucullatus (I)(A)
Indian silverbill, Euodice malabarica (I)(A)
Scaly-breasted munia, Lonchura punctulata (I)(A)
Tricolored munia, Lonchura malacca (I)

Old World sparrows
Order: PasseriformesFamily: Passeridae

Old World sparrows are small passerine birds. In general, sparrows tend to be small, plump, brown or grey birds with short tails and short powerful beaks. Sparrows are seed eaters, but they also consume small insects.

House sparrow, Passer domesticus (I)

New World sparrows
Order: PasseriformesFamily: Passerellidae

Until 2017, these species were considered part of the family Emberizidae. Most of the species are known as sparrows, but these birds are not closely related to the Old World sparrows which are in the family Passeridae. Many of these have distinctive head patterns.

Dark-eyed junco, Junco hyemalis (A)
Song sparrow, Melospiza melodia (A)

Spindalises
Order: PasseriformesFamily: Spindalidae

The members of this small family are native to the Greater Antilles. They were formerly classified as tanagers but were placed in their own family in 2017.

Puerto Rican spindalis, Spindalis portoricensis (A)

Troupials and allies
Order: PasseriformesFamily: Icteridae

The icterids are a group of small to medium-sized, often colourful, passerine birds restricted to the New World and include the grackles, New World blackbirds and New World orioles. Most species have black as the predominant plumage colour, often enlivened by yellow, orange or red.

Bobolink, Dolichonyx oryzivorus (A)
Orchard oriole, Icterus spurius (A)
Venezuelan troupial, Icterus icterus (A)
Baltimore oriole, Icterus galbula (A)
Shiny cowbird, Molothrus bonariensis (A)
Greater Antillean grackle, Quiscalus niger (A)

New World warblers
Order: PasseriformesFamily: Parulidae

The New World warblers are a group of small, often colourful, passerine birds restricted to the New World. Most are arboreal, but some are terrestrial. Most members of this family are insectivores.

Ovenbird, Seiurus aurocapilla 
Worm-eating warbler, Helmitheros vermivorus (A)
Louisiana waterthrush, Parkesia motacilla (A)
Northern waterthrush, Parkesia noveboracensis
Golden-winged warbler, Vermivora chrysoptera (A)
Blue-winged warbler, Vermivora cyanoptera (A)
Black-and-white warbler, Mniotilta varia
Prothonotary warbler, Protonotaria citrea (A)
Swainson's warbler, Limnothlypis swainsonii (A)
Tennessee warbler, Leiothlypis peregrina (A)
Orange-crowned warbler, Leiothlypis celata (A)
Nashville warbler, Leiothlypis ruficapilla (A)
Connecticut warbler, Oporornis agilis (A)
Mourning warbler, Geothlypis philadelphia (A)
Kentucky warbler, Geothlypis formosa (A)
Common yellowthroat, Geothlypis trichas (A)
Hooded warbler, Setophaga citrina (A)
American redstart, Setophaga ruticilla
Cape May warbler, Setophaga tigrina 
Cerulean warbler, Setophaga cerulea
Northern parula, Setophaga americana
Magnolia warbler, Setophaga magnolia (A)
Bay-breasted warbler, Setophaga castanea (A)
Blackburnian warbler, Setophaga fusca (A)
Yellow warbler, Setophaga petechia
Chestnut-sided warbler, Setophaga pensylvanica (A)
Blackpoll warbler, Setophaga striata 
Black-throated blue warbler, Setophaga caerulescens (A)
Palm warbler, Setophaga palmarum (A)
Yellow-rumped warbler, Setophaga coronata (A)
Yellow-throated warbler, Setophaga dominica (A)
Prairie warbler, Setophaga discolor
Adelaide's warbler, Setophaga adelaidae (A)
Golden-cheeked warbler, Setophaga chrysoparia (A)
Black-throated green warbler, Setophaga virens (A)
Canada warbler, Cardellina canadensis (A)

Cardinals and allies
Order: PasseriformesFamily: Cardinalidae

The cardinals are a family of robust, seed-eating birds with strong bills. They are typically associated with open woodland. The sexes usually have distinct plumages.

Summer tanager, Piranga rubra (A)
Scarlet tanager, Piranga olivacea (A)
Rose-breasted grosbeak, Pheucticus ludovicianus (A)
Blue grosbeak, Passerina caerulea (A)
Indigo bunting, Passerina cyanea

Tanagers and allies
Order: PasseriformesFamily: Thraupidae

Bananaquit, Coereba flaveola
Lesser Antillean bullfinch, Loxigilla noctis
Black-faced grassquit, Melanospiza bicolor

See also
List of birds
Lists of birds by region

References

Virgin Islands
Fauna of the Caribbean by island